HD 121474 is a single star in the southern constellation of Centaurus, near the southern constellation border with Circinus. It is an orange-hued star and is faintly visible to the naked eye with an apparent visual magnitude of 4.70. This object is located at a distance of approximately 212 light years based on parallax, and it has an absolute magnitude of 0.67. It is drifting further away from the Sun with a radial velocity of +22 km/s.

This is an aging giant star with a stellar classification of K1.5IIIb:, having exhausted the supply of hydrogen at its core then cooled and expanded off the main sequence. At present it has 13 times the girth of the Sun, with a near-solar metallicity of −0.01. The star is radiating 70 times the luminosity of the Sun from its enlarged photosphere at an effective temperature of 4,679 K.

References 

K-type giants
Centaurus (constellation)
Durchmusterung objects
Centauri, 294
121474
068191
5241